Mount Belford is a high mountain summit of the Collegiate Peaks in the Sawatch Range of the Rocky Mountains of North America.

Climbing
Mount Belford lies near Mount Oxford and Missouri Mountain, and is often climbed in conjunction with one or both of these peaks.

See also

List of mountain peaks of Colorado
List of Colorado fourteeners

References

External links
Mount Belford at 14ers.com
Mount Belford at Summitpost
Photo Journal of a hike up Mount Belford
Mount Belford Trip Report & Summit Video

Mountains of Colorado
Mountains of Chaffee County, Colorado
Fourteeners of Colorado
North American 4000 m summits